Terje Vareberg (born 15 October 1948) is a Norwegian economist and business executive.

He was born in Vestre Åmøy in Rennesøy, and graduated as economist from the Norwegian School of Economics in 1974.

He has worked for the Ministry of Trade and Industry, the Ministry of Petroleum and Energy, and for Statoil. From 1983 to 1989 he was director of Agro Fellesslakteri. He was chairman of the board of SpareBank 1 SR-Bank from 1994, and CEO from 2000. In 2005, he was elected chairman of the Norwegian Savings Banks Association. He has also been member of the board of Rogaland Teater.

References

1948 births
Living people
People from Rennesøy
Norwegian businesspeople
Norwegian economists
Norwegian School of Economics alumni